The Tanjung Malim railway station is a Malaysian train station stationed at the north eastern side of and named after the town of Tanjung Malim, Perak. The station provides both Komuter and ETS services.

The station was first constructed in 1900 and at the time, served as the halt for the intercity trains. As part of the Rawang-Ipoh double tracking and electrification project, it was rebuilt in 2007 and reopened two years later, on 1 June 2009, as the final stop in the Rawang-Tanjung Malim shuttle service (formerly known as the Rawang-Kuala Kubu Bharu shuttle service). The service has since 2016 been merged with the Port Klang Line, making Tanjung Malim the northern terminus of the line.

The station, unlike the four other stations along the shuttle route, is situated along three railways with three platforms. Its only similarity with the other stations on the shuttle route is that it also contains facilities normally reserved for medium-to-large stations along three or more lines. In addition to ticketing facilities and basic amenities, the station contains spaces for administrative occupants, as well as a kiosk and an additional foot bridge (fused with a foot bridge exclusively for Komuter users) for pedestrians that simply intend to cross the railway lines. The station also includes low-tech support for disabled passengers. The station exits northeast into a branch road that leads west into the town centre of Tanjung Malim.

The Tanjung Malim station's one side platform and one island platform are designated as Platform 1 (adjoining the main station building at the west, intended for northbound trains), Platform 2 (at the east, intended for southbound trains), and Platform 3.

Location and locality 
It is located in Tanjung Malim town in Muallim District, Perak, Malaysia. This station is very close to Universiti Pendidikan Sultan Idris old campus and is in reasonably near distance to its new campus in Proton City, which also locates PROTON production plant there. Sultan Azlan Shah Polytechnic also is near to the area.

The station also serves Behrang (as Behrang station don't serve many services hence it became their main station) and bordering towns of Hulu Selangor like Hulu Bernam town and Kalumpang.

Train services
 ETS Train No. EG9022/EG9032: KL Sentral–Ipoh
 ETS Train No. ES9051/EG9031: Ipoh–KL Sentral
 ETS Train No. EG9420/EG9425: Padang Besar–Gemas
 Port Klang Line services

References

External links

 Tanjung Malim Railway Station

KTM ETS railway stations
Muallim District
Railway stations in Perak
Rapid transit stations in Perak
Rawang-Seremban Line
Railway stations opened in 1900